St. John Welles Lucas-Lucas, commonly known as St. John Lucas, (18791934) was an English poet known for his anthologies of verse. He was educated at University College, Oxford. He was from 1905 a friend and mentor of Rupert Brooke.

Lucas wrote short stories and vignettes for Blackwood's Magazine and Open Window.  His The Oxford Book of French Verse was published by the Clarendon Press in 1907. A selection of his stories was published in book form by William Blackwood and Sons in 1919 under the title Saints, Sinners, and the Usual People.

He is described in Mike Read's Forever England: The Life of Rupert Brooke as "a homosexual aesthete".

References 

1879 births
1934 deaths
Anthologists
People from Rugby, Warwickshire
Alumni of University College, Oxford
English male poets
20th-century English poets
20th-century English male writers
British gay writers
English LGBT poets